Themes – Volume 3: September 85 – June 87 is box set released by Simple Minds. It was released on 8 October 1990 by Virgin Records

Track listing

Notes

References

Themes – Volume 3: September 85 – June 87 at The Official Site

1990 compilation albums
Simple Minds compilation albums
Virgin Records compilation albums